The Distance Education Accrediting Commission is an accrediting agency recognized by the Council for Higher Education Accreditation (CHEA) and the U.S. Department of Education (USDE). The agency accredits institutions from the primary level through universities. This list includes the degree-granting institutions (universities) accredited by the DEAC.

Accredited, Degree-Granting Institutions

Accredited, Postsecondary Institutions

Formerly Accredited Institutions

References

Universities
Distance education institutions based in the United States
Lists of universities and colleges in the United States